Öresundsparken is a park in Malmö, Sweden. The park was built in the 1920s to fill the area beside the railway line. It was opened in 1924 and consists mainly of three ponds.

Parks in Malmö